Belva is an unincorporated community and census-designated place in west Nicholas County and north Fayette County, West Virginia, United States; while the CDP only includes the Nicholas County portion, the Fayette County portion is considered part of the community. The town is situated at the bottomland surrounding the convergence of Bells Creek with Twentymile Creek and, subsequently, Twenty Mile Creek with the Gauley River. Belva is also the location of the convergence of two state highways: West Virginia Route 16 and West Virginia Route 39.

History
The community is named in honor of Belva Ann Lockwood, a presidential candidate and early feminist.

The Belva post office was established in 1885.

Climate
The climate in this area is characterized by hot, humid summers and generally mild to cool winters. According to the Köppen Climate Classification system, Belva has a humid subtropical climate, abbreviated "Cfa" on climate maps.

See also
Lockwood, West Virginia, another community in Nicholas County named for Lockwood.

References

Census-designated places in Nicholas County, West Virginia
Census-designated places in Fayette County, West Virginia
Census-designated places in West Virginia
Unincorporated communities in West Virginia